"The Black Hills of Dakota" is a song, written for the musical film, Calamity Jane, about the singer's love for, and desire to return to, the Black Hills of South Dakota.

The music was written by Sammy Fain, and the lyrics by Paul Francis Webster, in 1953.

The most notable recording of the song was done by Doris Day, issued both on the soundtrack album of the film, and as a single which was released in June 1954. Doris Day's recording reached No. 7 on the UK chart.

In 2010, Australian singer Melinda Schneider recorded the song for her Doris Day tribute album, Melinda Does Doris.

References

1953 songs
Songs with music by Sammy Fain
Songs with lyrics by Paul Francis Webster
Songs from musicals
Black Hills
Doris Day songs
1950s ballads